Washingmachine Mouth is a 1993 remix album by Pigface, containing remixes of tracks from Fook and two versions of the previously unreleased song "Cutting Face".

Track listing

Personnel
Martin Atkins - drums, engineer (4), production
Andrew Weiss - bass (2, 3-5)
Paul Raven - bass (2, 3-5)
En Esch - guitar (2, 3-5)
William Tucker - guitar (2, 3-5, 7), bass (6, 9), programming (8, 9), mixing (1, 2, 5, 7)
Mary Byker - vocals (2, 4, 5, 7)
Mark Walk - engineer (1-3, 5-7)
Chris Connelly - mixing (2, 5)
Peter Conway - guitar (4)

References

Pigface albums
1993 remix albums